JQuranTree is a set of Java APIs for accessing and analyzing the Quran in its authentic Arabic form. The Uthmani distribution of the Tanzil project is used and is left unmodified.

The library contains:
 a Java API which wraps the XML Uthmani Script of the Tanzil project
 an object model for the Quran's orthography
 encoders and decoders for converting Arabic text 
 Java classes for searching the text of the Quran

The library includes a user guide and API documentation with examples on using the library to perform basic analysis of Quranic text.

Source code repository 

The JQuranTree source code is hosted as a public GitHub repository.

See also 
 Digital Quran
 Quranic Arabic Corpus - Builds on the JQuranTree API to annotate the Arabic grammar of the Quran

References

External links 
corpus.quran.com/java
Quran.com

Quran software
Free software programmed in Java (programming language)